Hoonah Airport  is a state-owned public-use airport located one nautical mile (2 km) southeast of the central business district of Hoonah, Alaska.

This airport is included in the National Plan of Integrated Airport Systems for 2015–2019, which categorized it as a nonprimary commercial service airport based on 9,564 enplanements in 2012. As per Federal Aviation Administration records, the airport had 7,680 passenger boardings (enplanements) in calendar year 2008, 7,651 enplanements in 2009, and 10,759 in 2010.

Facilities and aircraft 
Hoonah Airport has one runway designated 6/24 with an asphalt surface measuring 2,997 by 75 feet (913 x 23 m). For the 12-month period ending December 31, 2007, the airport had 3,750 aircraft operations, an average of 10 per day: 80% air taxi and 20% general aviation.

Airlines and destinations 
The following airline offers scheduled service:

Statistics

See also 
 Hoonah Seaplane Base
 List of airports in Alaska

References

External links 
 Topographic map from USGS The National Map

Airports in the Hoonah–Angoon Census Area, Alaska